Baljuvon is a village and jamoat in Tajikistan. It is located in Baljuvon District in Khatlon Region. The jamoat has a total population of 6,041 (2015).

Climate

References

Populated places in Khatlon Region
Jamoats of Tajikistan